Santner is a surname. Notable people with the surname include:

Eric Santner (born 1955), American academic
Johann Santner (1840–1912), Austrian mountain climber
Mitchell Santner (born 1992), New Zealand cricketer

See also
Santer